Signal-to-noise ratio (SNR) is used in imaging to characterize image quality.  The sensitivity of a (digital or film) imaging system is typically described in the terms of the signal level that yields a threshold level of SNR.

Industry standards define sensitivity in terms of the ISO film speed equivalent, using SNR thresholds (at average scene luminance) of 40:1 for "excellent" image quality and 10:1 for "acceptable" image quality.

SNR is sometimes quantified in decibels (dB) of signal power relative to noise power, though in the imaging field the concept of "power" is sometimes taken to be the power of a voltage signal proportional to optical power; so a 20 dB SNR may mean either 10:1 or 100:1 optical power, depending on which definition is in use.

Definition of SNR
Traditionally, SNR is defined to be the ratio of the average signal value  to the standard deviation  of the signal :

when the signal is an optical intensity, or as the square of this value if the signal and noise are viewed as amplitudes (field quantities).

See also
 Coefficient of variation
 Contrast-to-noise ratio
 Minimum resolvable contrast
 Minimum resolvable temperature difference
 Optical transfer function
 Signal-to-noise ratio
 Signal transfer function

References

Further reading
 ISO 15739:2003, Photography – Electronic still-picture imaging – Noise measurements: specifies methods for measuring and reporting the noise versus signal level and dynamic range of electronic still-picture cameras. It applies to both monochrome and colour electronic still-picture cameras.
 ISO 12232:2006, Photography – Digital still cameras – Determination of exposure index, ISO speed ratings, standard output sensitivity, and recommended exposure index: specifies the method for assigning and reporting ISO speed ratings, ISO speed latitude ratings, standard output sensitivity values, and recommended exposure index values for digital still cameras. ISO 12232:2006 is applicable to both monochrome and colour digital still cameras. It revises ISO 12232:1998.

Image processing
Physical quantities
Science of photography